This is a list of manga that topped The New York Times Manga Best Seller list in 2014.

See also
 The New York Times Fiction Best Sellers of 2014
 The New York Times Non-Fiction Best Sellers of 2014

References

2014
2014 in the United States
2014 in comics
Lists of manga